The sixth edition of the Dutch Supercup was held on 16 August 1995 at De Kuip in Rotterdam. The match featured the winners of the 1994–95 Eredivisie, Ajax, and the winners of the 1994–95 KNVB Cup, Feyenoord. This was the third year in a row that the Dutch Supercup involved these two teams. The games was won by Ajax 2–1 after extra time, with the Ajax goals coming from Ronald de Boer and Patrick Kluivert, and Henrik Larsson scoring for Feyenoord. This victory meant Ajax had won the Supercup three years in a row.

This was the last Supercup game to be played under the title Dutch Supercup, with subsequent cups being known under the title Johan Cruyff Shield.

Match details

 

1995
Supercup
D
D
Dutch Supercup